Derya Bard Sarıaltın (born May 14, 1977), formerly Svana Bard, is a Turkish archer of Ukrainian origin.

She participated at the 2005 Mediterranean Games in Almería, Spain and won bronze medal in women’s individual category and silver medal with the Turkish team. At the World Cup & Grand Prix held on June 20–25, 2006 in San Salvador, El Salvador, she became gold medalist with her Turkish national team.

References

1977 births
Living people
Turkish female archers
Naturalized citizens of Turkey
Turkish people of Ukrainian descent
Ukrainian emigrants to Turkey
Mediterranean Games silver medalists for Turkey
Mediterranean Games bronze medalists for Turkey
Competitors at the 2005 Mediterranean Games
Mediterranean Games medalists in archery